Gian Zola Nasrulloh Nugraha (born 5 August 1998) is an Indonesian professional footballer who plays for Liga 1 club Arema. Zola plays mainly as a central or an attacking midfielder but can also play as a winger.

Club career

Persib Bandung
He joined Persib Bandung to play in the 2016 Indonesia Soccer Championship A after signing a four-year contract. Zola made his debut on 15 April 2017 in a match against Arema in the Liga 1. On 20 May 2017, Zola scored his first goal for Persib against Borneo in the 22nd minute at the Gelora Bandung Lautan Api Stadium, Bandung.

Persela Lamongan
He was loaned to Persela Lamongan in the 2018 Liga 1 season. Zola made his debut on 29 July 2018 in a match against Persipura Jayapura.

Arema
On 5 April 2022, Zola signed a contract for Arema. Zola made his debut on 24 July 2022 in a match against Borneo Samarinda at Segiri Stadium.

International career
He made his international debut on 21 March 2017 against Myanmar.

Personal life
The name "Gian Zola" is taken from Chelsea and Italy legend Gianfranco Zola. He is currently also enrolled as a student at the Pasundan University, majoring law..

Career statistics

Club

International

International goals 
Scores and results list Indonesia's goal tally first.

Honours

Club 
Arema
 Indonesia President's Cup: 2022

International 
Indonesia U-22
 AFF U-22 Youth Championship: 2019

References

External links
 

1998 births
Living people
Sportspeople from Bandung
Sportspeople from West Java 
Liga 1 (Indonesia) players
Indonesian footballers
Persib Bandung players
Persela Lamongan players
Arema F.C. players
Indonesia youth international footballers
Indonesia international footballers
Association football midfielders